Kenneth Humphrey Eastwood (born 23 November 1935) is a former Australian cricketer who played one Test in 1971.

A left-handed opening batsman, Ken Eastwood played first-class cricket for Victoria from 1959–60 to 1971–72. In 1969–70, when Victoria won the Sheffield Shield, he was their leading batsman, with 584 runs at an average of 41.71. In the 1970-71 Sheffield Shield, he scored 737 runs at an average of 122.83, with three centuries and a top score of 221.

He replaced Bill Lawry in the Test team for the final match of the series against England in 1970-71, although Lawry had been the Test captain since 1968. Eastwood failed with the bat, scoring five and a duck, but took one wicket, that of Keith Fletcher, with his left-arm unorthodox spin.

In a booklet about Eastwood produced by the Australian Cricket Society, it was revealed that although Eastwood played only one Test, he ended up with two caps. He was given two caps to try for size, and no one ever asked him to return the unused one.

See also
 One Test Wonder

References

External links
 
 "One Test, Two Caps" by Brydon Coverdale

1935 births
Living people
Australia Test cricketers
Victoria cricketers
Australian cricketers
Cricketers from Sydney